Mohit Ray (born 1954) is an Indian environmental and human rights activist based in Kolkata. He has campaigned for saving the Adi Ganga, Bikramgarh Jheel and other water bodies of Kolkata. His seminal work in this field is the extensive research on the water bodies and heritage ponds of Kolkata. His work has been published by the Kolkata Municipal Corporation and Ananda Publishers. He has also published a number of papers in technical journals. He writes regularly on environmental issues in different journals including The Statesman, a national daily, in Anandabazar Patrika, Ei Samay and Bartaman, the Bengali dailies. He has also campaigned for a long time against the persecution of minorities in Bangladesh and the citizenship rights of the Bengali Hindu refugees.

Early life and career 
Ray was born in Kolkata into a Bengali Hindu migrant family from East Bengal in 1954. He graduated in chemical engineering from Jadavpur University in 1976. In 1979 he completed his post-graduation from the University of Manchester. A year later he joined Engineers India Limited and relocated to New Delhi. In 1988, he joined Development Consultants Limited and shifted to Kolkata. In 1995, Ray quit Development Consultants and began independent consultancy. He has worked as a consultant for a number of World Bank and Asian Development Bank projects. He has been a visiting faculty in the Environment Programme for M.Phil. at the School of Environmental Studies of Jadavpur University, in Academic Staff College of Jadavpur University and in the Environmental Management Department of Indian Institute of Social Welfare and Business Management. He completed his Ph.D. in engineering from Jadavpur University in 2005. He is a small-time BJP leader; he fought in the 2016 assembly election in Bengal from Jadavpur with a BJP ticket and lost.

Environmental activism 

Ray has remained in the forefront of environmental activism in Kolkata for last two and half decades. He been associated with a number of NGOs involved in environmental activities and he leads a small non-funded group named Vasundhara. He has been an active participant or adviser to efforts like restoring water bodies, saving Adi Ganga, questioning concreting the water bodies to rights of bicycle riders as a non-polluting vehicle. The discovery, identification and documentation of 48 heritage water bodies of Kolkata and environmental and social details of several thousand water bodies of Kolkata constitutes his seminal work in this field. Ray believes that the possibility of serious water and environmental crisis due to diminishing numbers of water bodies in the city can only be addressed by better management of the existing water bodies through technological innovations. For Ray, environment cannot be delinked from peoples’ livelihood concerns. So he emphasizes environmental improvement, along with development.

Human rights activism 
Ray has been active in social issues from his student days. He was the founder convener of Democratic Students Front at Jadavpur University, the students organization that was formed after the Emergency was lifted. His concern for human rights led him to become an executive member of People's Union for Democratic Rights and the joint secretary of Association for Protection of Democratic Rights. For last one decade he has organized a campaign for the human rights of the Hindu-Buddhist-Christian minorities in Bangladesh through the auspices of CAAMB.  In May 2014, Ray along with other delegates from several human rights bodies from various countries met the Indian president Pranab Mukherjee to convey him of the human rights issues plaguing the minorities of Bangladesh.

Publications 
Ray has written a number of books in Bengali and  English published by reputed publishers. He has also written fiction based on the theme of environment.

Non-fiction 
 Pukurer Rupkatha (2015), Shishu Sahitya Sangsad, 
 Paschim Bangladesh (2015), CAMP, 
 Five Thousand Mirrors - The Water Bodies of Kolkata (2015), Jadavpur University Press, 
 Kalikata Pukurkatha - Paribesh Itihas Samaj (2013), Ananda Publishers, 
 Bangladesh O Paschimbanga - Kichu Bidhibaddha Satarkikaran (2013), Camp, 
 Old Mirrors – Traditional Ponds of Kolkata (2010), Kolkata Municipal Corporation
 Paribesher Jatpat - Garib Deshe Paribesh O Unnayan (2010), Gangchil
 Batas Hok Madhumay (2002), Anustup
 Bitarker Paribesh (2002), Anustup
 Paribesh: Atibeguni Rashmi Theke Himalay Dushan (1998), Progressive Publishers, 
 Prasanga Paribesh - Darshan Rajniti Bijnan (1992), Anustup,

Fiction 
 Gachhera Meyera - Nari O Paribesher Galpa (2000)
 Ekti Abadharita Mrityur Dharabibarani (1990)
 Mahadeb Nayek Mar Kachhe Jachchhe O Anyanya Galpa (1983)

Articles 
 Ray, Mohit and Majumder, S. (2005). "Evaluating Economic Sustainability Of Urban And Peri-Urban Waterbodies - A Case Study From Kolkata Ponds". Evaluating Economic Sustainability Of Urban And Peri-Urban Waterbodies - A Case Study From Kolkata Ponds (edited Sengupta, Nirmal and Bandyopadhyay, Jayanta). MacMillan. New Delhi.
 Ray, Mohit (2004). Energy, CDM and Quality of Life. Resource Conservation and Management Systems – Concepts and Case Studies (edited by Ghosh, Sadhan K.). Oxford Publishing House. Kolkata.
 Ray, Mohit (2002). Nuclear Fallout – On Environment and Politics. India's Nuclear Policy (edited Ghosh, A.). Progressive Publishers. Kolkata.
 Ray, Mohit (2001). Environmental Impact Assessment and Audit: A Management Approach. Industrial Pollution. (edited Mukherjea, R. N., et al.). Allied Publishers. New Delhi.

References 

Indian environmentalists
Indian human rights activists
1954 births
Living people
Writers from Kolkata
Jadavpur University alumni
Alumni of the University of Manchester
21st-century Indian essayists
English-language writers from India
Bengali-language writers
Activists from West Bengal